László Hammerl (born 15 February 1942) is a Hungarian sport shooter and Olympic champion. He won a gold medal in the 50 metre rifle prone event at the 1964 Summer Olympics in Tokyo.

References

1942 births
Living people
Hungarian male sport shooters
ISSF rifle shooters
Olympic shooters of Hungary
Olympic gold medalists for Hungary
Olympic silver medalists for Hungary
Olympic bronze medalists for Hungary
Shooters at the 1964 Summer Olympics
Shooters at the 1968 Summer Olympics
Shooters at the 1972 Summer Olympics
Shooters at the 1976 Summer Olympics
Olympic medalists in shooting
Medalists at the 1964 Summer Olympics
Medalists at the 1968 Summer Olympics
Sport shooters from Budapest
20th-century Hungarian people